The Lass from the Stormy Croft is a 1917 Swedish drama film directed by Victor Sjöström, based on the 1908 novella with the same title by Selma Lagerlöf. It was the first in a series of successful Lagerlöf adaptions by Sjöström, made possible by a deal between Lagerlöf and A-B Svenska Biografteatern (later AB Svensk Filmindustri) to adapt at least one Lagerlöf novel each year. Lagerlöf had for many years denied any proposal to let her novels be adapted for film, but after seeing Sjöström's Terje Vigen she finally decided to give her consent.

It was originally released in the US as The Girl from the March Croft and the UK as The Woman He Chose. However it is today generally referred to as The Lass from the Stormy Croft, which is closer to the original Swedish title. Six other adaptions of the same novel have been made, a German and a Turkish in 1935, a Finnish in 1940, another Swedish in 1947, a Danish (Husmandstøsen) in 1952 and another German in 1958.

Plot
As described in a film magazine (with English names), Helga, the girl from the Marsh Croft, appears in court against Peter Martenson, the father of her child, but withdraws her charge when he is about to perjure himself. This wins the admiration of Gudmund Erlandson, who persuades his parents to take the disgraced young woman into their home as a servant. Gudmund becomes engaged to Hildur, the daughter of a wealthy neighbor, but then is involved in a drunken orgy where a man is murdered. Believing himself guilty, he confesses on his wedding morn, and Hildur turns from him. Helga, having proof of his innocence, seeks to reunite the couple before she proves it. However, during this crisis Gudmund discovers that it is Helga that he loves. When his innocence is established, it is her that he marries.

Cast
 Greta Almroth as Helga Nilsdotter
 William Larsson as Helga's Father
 Thekla Borgh as Helga's Mother
 Lars Hanson as Gudmund Erlandsson
 Hjalmar Selander as Erland Erlandsson
 Concordia Selander as Ingeborg Erlandsson
 Karin Molander as Hildur Persson
 Georg Blomstedt as Erik Persson
 Jenny Tschernichin-Larsson as Hildur's Mother
 Gösta Cederlund as Per Mårtensson
 Edla Rothgardt as Mrs. Mårtensson
 Nils Ahrén  as Judge

References

External links

 

1917 drama films
1917 films
Swedish black-and-white films
Films based on works by Selma Lagerlöf
Films directed by Victor Sjöström
Swedish silent feature films
Swedish drama films
Silent drama films
1910s Swedish-language films